Monanus concinnulus is a species of silvanid flat bark beetle in the family Silvanidae. It is found in the Caribbean, Central America, North America, and Southern Asia.

References

Further reading

External links

 

Silvanidae
Articles created by Qbugbot
Beetles described in 1858